Mount Kearsarge is the name of two different mountains in New Hampshire:

 Mount Kearsarge (Merrimack County, New Hampshire), located in Wilmot, New Hampshire, and Warner, New Hampshire
 Kearsarge North, located about 4 miles northeast of North Conway, New Hampshire

See also

 Kearsarge (disambiguation)